The Haddiscoe Cut or New Cut is a canal in the English county of Norfolk and in The Broads National Park.). The cut was conceived as a way to provide a more direct route from Lowestoft to Norwich, and was built as part of a larger scheme which included the linking of the River Waveney to Oulton Broad and Lake Lothing. It was opened in 1833, but the new route was not a financial success, and it was sold to a railway developer in 1842. It remained in railway ownership until Nationalisation in 1948, and was damaged by floods in 1953. An attempt to close it in 1954 was resisted by local interests, resulting in it being repaired. It is now managed by the Environment Agency.

History
Prior to the 1820s, Norwich was served by vessels using the River Yare, which flows through Breydon Water before joining the River Bure and then the North Sea near Great Yarmouth. Breydon Water is a wide expanse of shallow water, and therefore required cargo arriving at Yarmouth to be trans-shipped into smaller vessels which could then reach Norwich. There was discontent among the merchants of Norwich at the cost of trans-shipment, and allegations of systematic theft of cargo, which resulted in a court case in 1820, when 18 men were convicted of taking the goods and another of receiving it. Against this background, William Cubitt was asked to investigate possible solutions in 1814.

Cubitt's first plan involved general improvements to the River Yare, and the dredging of a deeper channel along the southern edge of Breydon Water. He estimated that this would cost £35,000, and his plan was published in 1818, but there were immediate objections from the Corporation of Yarmouth, who called on the engineer John Rennie for advice. Rennie concluded that the plan would lead to the silting of Yarmouth harbour. Cubitt therefore looked at alternatives, and produced a plan to link the Yare to Lowestoft (pronounced locally as Lowstuff), which would cost over £70,000. Yarmouth again objected, but a bill based on the new plan was put before Parliament in 1826. It was defeated, but a second bill was presented, which was passed on 28 May 1827, despite vigorous campaigning against it by Yarmouth.

Construction
The new Act of Parliament created the Norwich and Lowestoft Navigation Company, and authorised them to raise £100,000, with an additional £50,000 if required. Work began on the Lake Lothing link, with most of it completed during 1829. A demonstration of this was given on 3 June 1831, when it was estimated that 3,000 tons of stones and shingle were carried out to sea.

The contract for the Haddiscoe Cut was signed with Thomas Townsend of Birmingham on 3 July 1832, and work began at once. Thomas Townsend worked as contractor on the canal throughout its construction. The original capital was insufficient to finance the construction, and so the extra £50,000 authorised by the Poor Employment Act was borrowed from the Exchequer Bill Loan Commissioners. The cut was finished in 1832, and the dredging of the River Yare completed in 1833.

Operation
The new undertaking was not a financial success, with income failing to match expenditure. The Company was unable to repay the £50,000 loan, and so in 1842 the Exchequer Bill Loan Commissioners took control of the navigation, and sold it to Sir Samuel Morton Peto, a developer who wanted to build railways along its banks. The line from Reedham to Lowestoft runs parallel to the cut and effectively forms the south western bank. Although maintained for navigation, the cut was owned by a series of railway companies for the next hundred years.

Control of the Cut passed to the British Transport Commission with the nationalisation of the railways. The cut was damaged by the floods of 1953, which affected much of the East Coast, and the Transport Commission attempted to close it in 1954. Local opposition was strong, particularly from the yachting community, and control of it passed to the East Suffolk and Norfolk River Board in 1957. Subsequently, the Anglian Water Authority, and in 1995 the Environment Agency, took over this role.

Today
In 1993 failure of the piling resulted in part of the railway embankment being washed away. More recently, flood prevention measures have resulted in reconstruction of the river defences and walls, and this work was completed in 2006.

Route

See also

Canals of the United Kingdom
History of the British canal system

Bibliography

References

 Ordnance Survey (2005). OS Explorer Map OL40 - The Broads. .
 Waterscape: Haddiscoe New Cut

Canals in England
Canals in Norfolk
Canals opened in 1833
Norfolk Broads